"You Don't Know Nothin'" is the title of a R&B single by For Real, it was the final single from their debut album It's a Natural Thang.'' It became the biggest single in the UK from their debut album.

Tracklisting
You Don't Know Nothin' / Easy To Love
1.) You Don't Know Nothin' (Edit) [3:20]
2.) You Don't Know Nothin' (E-Smoove's Fever CD Edit) [5:29]
3.) Easy To Love (Ballad Version) [4:14]
4.) Easy To Love (In Da Soul Old Skool 12") [4:24]

Chart positions

References

1995 singles
1994 songs
For Real songs
A&M Records singles
Songs written by Mervyn Warren